The 2015–16 Notre Dame Fighting Irish women's basketball team will represent University of Notre Dame during the 2015–16 NCAA Division I women's basketball season. The Fighting Irish, led by twenty-ninth year head coach Muffet McGraw, play their home games at Edmund P. Joyce Center and were third year members of the Atlantic Coast Conference. They finished the season with 33–2, 16–0 in ACC play to win both of the ACC Regular Season and Tournament. They earn an automatic bid to the NCAA women's tournament where they defeat North Carolina A&T and Indiana in both the first and second rounds before losing to Stanford in the sweet sixteen, which ended 5 straight Final Four appearances.

Roster

Media
All Notre Dame games will air on WHPZ Pulse 96.9 FM. Games are streamed online live.

Rankings

Schedule

|-
!colspan=9 style="background:#002649; color:white;"|Exhibition

|-
!colspan=9 style="background:#002649; color:white;"| Regular season

|-
!colspan=9 style="background:#002649; color:white;"| ACC Women's Tournament

|-
!colspan=9 style="background:#002649; color:white;"| NCAA Women's Tournament

Source

See also
 2015–16 Notre Dame Fighting Irish men's basketball team

References

Notre Dame Fighting Irish women's basketball seasons
Notre Dame
Notre Dame
Notre Dame Fighting Irish
Notre Dame Fighting Irish